Bibliography of works on The Simpsons is a list of works about the American multimedia franchise The Simpsons, its themes, and its cultural influence.

Chronological list

See also
 List of The Simpsons books

References

External links
 

The Simpsons lists
Non-fiction books about The Simpsons
Simpsons